The 8th Confession is the eighth book in the Women's Murder Club series featuring Lindsay Boxer by James Patterson. This novel was released on April 27, 2009.

Plot

Stacey Glenn, a dropout girl from the high society is convicted of multiple counts of murder by Yuki Castellano - the lawyer of the Murder Club. Glenn is killed and beheaded once she arrives in prison.

The major plot develops around two cases: a homeless man who goes by the name of Bagman Jesus is beaten to death and then targeted with multiple shots; Linsday and her friends investigate the case but they initially find a wall of silence defending him; many people living in the slums where he lived seem to consider him a sort of a saint.
Boxer's team finally gives Bagman Jesus an identity; he is Rodney Brooker, a meth dealer who provoked a terrible explosion with a school bus he used as a drug laboratory; he was not loved by the people who knew him but on the contrary he was feared and hated; he had been actually killed by his mates; who also planned to put the blame one on the other in order to make all confessions void and impossible to be used in a courtroom.

Then there's a girl, whom the reader comes to meet as "Pet Girl", who kills rich people without leaving any trace behind; the corpses seem immaculate and intact. She kills multiple couples until Boxer and her partner Rich Conklin manage to trace her while she's trying another murder; her victims were killed with poison from lethal snakes; one of them bites Rich; but he manages to survive and Pet Girl is arrested.
In the end, she's revealed to be Norma Johnson, daughter of a man who had taught her how to manage dangerous snakes but wanted to throw her out of his house since she was hated by his lover; Norma had killed him and from then on she had become a serial killer out of revenge.

Women's Murder Club (novel series)
2009 American novels
Little, Brown and Company books
Collaborative novels